Alexander Nikolaevich Shustitskiy (born 25 December 2002) is a Russian ice dancer. With his former partner, Sofya Tyutyunina, he is the 2020 Youth Olympic silver medalist and a three-time ISU Junior Grand Prix medalist, including silver at 2019 JGP Croatia. They also won a silver medal in the team event at the 2020 Winter Youth Olympics.

Personal life 
Shustitskiy was born on 25 December 2002 in Moscow.

Career

Early career 
Shustitskiy began skating in 2007. He skated for two seasons with Ekaterina Isaicheva in 2011–12 and 2012–13.

Shustitskiy teamed up with Sofya Tyutyunina in May 2013. At the NRW Trophy, they won basic novice gold in 2013 and silver in 2014. Tyutyunina/Shustitskiy are also the 2015 Volvo Open Cup bronze medalists and the 2016 NRW Trophy silver medalists on the advanced novice level.

Tyutyunina/Shustitskiy qualified to their first Russian Junior Championships in 2018, placing 14th. They did not compete internationally in 2018–19, but competed at the 2019 Russian Junior Championships, placing eighth.

2019–20 season 

Tyutyunina/Shustitskiy received their first Junior Grand Prix assignments, their first international appearances since a fifth-place finish at the 2017 Santa Claus Cup. At their first event in Latvia, they were fourth after the rhythm dance but placed third in the free dance to move up to third overall, narrowly winning the bronze medal by 0.67 points over Canada's Natalie D'Alessandro / Bruce Waddell. Tyutyunina/Shustitskiy were the silver medalists at their second event, JGP Croatia, nearly 15 points behind champions Maria Kazakova / Georgy Reviya of Georgia, who had also placed ahead of them in Latvia. Their results qualified them as first alternates to the 2019–20 Junior Grand Prix Final.

In January, Tyutyunina/Shustitskiy represented Russia at the 2020 Winter Youth Olympics in Lausanne, Switzerland. They were second in both segments of the competition to win the silver medal behind teammates Irina Khavronina / Dario Cirisano and ahead of Americans Katarina Wolfkostin / Jeffrey Chen. Tyutyunina/Shustiskiy said they enjoyed the atmosphere created by the large crowd, composed primarily of local children, and called it a "very special" experience for them. During the team event, they were second individually behind Utana Yoshida / Shingo Nishiyama to help Team Focus (Yuma Kagiyama of Japan, Kate Wang of the United States, and Cate Fleming / Jedidiah Isbell of the United States) win the silver medal.

At the 2020 Russian Junior Championships in February, Tyutyunina/Shustitskiy were sixth in the rhythm dance and fifth in the free dance to finish fifth overall. As a result of their placement, they were named second alternates for the 2020 World Junior Championships.

2020–21 season 
Due to the COVID-19 pandemic, the Junior Grand Prix, where Tyutyunina/Shustitskiy would have competed, was cancelled. They instead competed in several domestic competitions over the first half of the season. Tyutyunina/Shustiskiy were unable to compete at the 2021 Russian Junior Championships in February after Tyutyunina fractured her leg in December.

2021–22 season 
With the resumption of the Junior Grand Prix, Tyutyunina/Shustitskiy competed at 2021 JGP Slovakia in Košice, where they placed third in both segments to win the bronze medal. They went on to win the 2021 JGP Austria, winning both segments of the competition.

In May, it was announced that the duo had split.

2022-23 season 

In July, it was announced that he had paired with Alexandra Kravchenko.

Programs 
 With Tyutyunina

Competitive highlights 
JGP: Junior Grand Prix

With Kravchenko

With Tyutyunina

Detailed results 
ISU Personal Bests highlighted in bold.

With Tyutyunina

Junior results

References

External links 
 
 

2002 births
Living people
Russian male ice dancers
Figure skaters at the 2020 Winter Youth Olympics
Figure skaters from Moscow